The Westshore Velodrome is a 333m outdoor bicycle racing track located in Colwood, B.C., and one of only two velodromes in British Columbia. It is part of the Juan de Fuca Recreation Centre, and is operated by the Greater Victoria Velodrome Association. The GVVA was founded in 1991. The velodrome was commissioned for the 1994 Commonwealth Games, and constructed for approximately $2 million. The track was designed to be used by the public after the Games, which is why the banking in the corners is less than might be found on tracks primarily intended for competition.

Stuart Peter O'Grady set a Commonwealth Games record in the 10-mile scratch race with a time of 18:50.520

In 2005, the velodrome was the host for the American Velodrome Challenge and the BC Provincial Track Championships.

The velodrome had some financial troubles immediately following the games, and sat in disuse until re-opening in the 2000s. Prior to 2008, the track was operated by the Westshore Parks and Recreation Society. It was reopened on July 29, 2011. In 2008, the mayor of Colwood voted to close the velodrome for good. It had been used prior to this for training local athletes, such as Ryder Hesjedal, but the cost of repairs to the infield were prohibitive.  The repairs to the infield were completed in April, 2015, and an artificial turf field was installed.
Olympic and World Championship medalist Gillian Carleton cites the opening of the velodrome as key to the beginning of her cycle racing career.

The newly reopened track hosted the 2011 and 2012 BC Track Championships.

If needed, the track could be used during the competition at the 2022 Commonwealth Games.

Major competitions hosted

References

1994 Commonwealth Games venues
Sports venues in British Columbia
Velodromes in Canada